Albert Williams was an African-American man who was lynched by a mob in Chiefland, Florida, on July 21, 1927.

John R. Steelman, who wrote his PhD dissertation on "mob action in the South", listed Albert Williams, and cited a local newspaper: "Albert Williams, charged with assault on a turpentine operator, was shot to death by a mob. The trouble is said to have arisen over a debt which Williams owed the white man."

References

External links

1927 in Florida
1927 murders in the United States
Lynching deaths in Florida
Murdered African-American people
People murdered in Florida
Race-related controversies in the United States
Racially motivated violence against African Americans
Levy County, Florida